The Civil Rights Cold Case Records Review Board is an independent agency tasked with examining unsolved murders of African Americans between 1940 and 1979. Established in 2019, the board is authorized for up to 7 years, and authorization may be extended for an additional year by board vote.

History 
The board was established upon the passing of the Civil Rights Cold Case Records Collection Act of 2018, which was signed into law by President Donald Trump in January 2019. The Act was originally drafted by students at Hightstown High School in New Jersey with an early version introduced by Rep. Bobby Rush from Chicago. After additional outreach and lobbying efforts by other cohorts of Highstown High School students, Senators Ted Cruz, Doug Jones introduced and sponsored the Senate version, which ultimately became law. After the bill was signed, the board was not staffed until February 2022, when a slate of board members nominated by President Joe Biden was confirmed by the U.S. Senate.

While the board was originally authorized for up to 4 years, due to the 3-year gap between the formation of the board and the confirmation of its first slate of members, government observers warned that the board would not have enough time to carry out its intended function. To address this, Senators Jon Ossoff and Ted Cruz submitted a bill in February 2022 to extend the board's mandate through 2027; the bill was signed into law in December 2022 by President Joe Biden.

Membership 
In June 2021, Clayborne Carson, Gabrielle Dudley, Hank Klibanoff, and Margaret Burnham became the first nominees to the board. In October 2021, Brenda Elaine Stevenson was also nominated to serve on the board. Carson's nomination was withdrawn by the White House on January 7, 2022.

Dudley, Klibanoff, Burnham, and Stevenson were all confirmed via voice vote on February 17, 2022. There is one open seat on the board.

References 
Independent agencies of the United States government